Løve is the third studio album by French singer Julien Doré, released through Columbia/Sony BMG on 28 October 2013. The album peaked at number four on the French Album Chart.

On 12 September 2015, a special 2 CD release was made being the albums Løve and Bichon. That joint release peaked at number 118 on the French Album Chart

Track listing

Charts

Release history

Løve Live

Løve Live is the follow up 2015 album of Julien Doré being his first live album. The album was released on Columbia/Sony BMG on 9 February 2015.

Live album Track listing

Charts

Løve Live DVD
The live performance was also released as a DVD.

Track listing

References

2013 albums
Julien Doré albums
Sony Music France albums